Arvid Lundberg (born September 29, 1994) is a Swedish professional ice hockey defenceman. He is currently playing with Skellefteå AIK of the Swedish Hockey League (SHL). He has also previously played with the Växjö Lakers.

Lundberg made his Elitserien debut playing with Skellefteå AIK during the 2011–12 Elitserien season.

References

External links

1994 births
Living people
Piteå HC players
Swedish ice hockey defencemen
Skellefteå AIK players
Växjö Lakers players
People from Skellefteå Municipality
Sportspeople from Västerbotten County